Alfredo Pacini (10 February 1888 – 23 December 1967) was an Italian Cardinal of the Roman Catholic Church. He served as Nuncio to Switzerland from 1960 to 1967, and made a cardinal in 1967.

Biography 
Alfredo Pacini was born in Capannori and studied at the seminary in Lucca before being ordained to the priesthood on 25 July 1913. He then did pastoral work in the Archdiocese of Lucca and taught at its seminary until 1915, when he became a military chaplain during World War I. After resuming his work in Lucca, Pacini was raised to the rank of Honorary Chamberlain of His Holiness on 8 October 1924. He served as secretary (1924-1928) and auditor (1928-1933) of the nunciature to Yugoslavia. From 1935 to 1944, he was auditor of the Polish nunciature. He became Domestic Prelate of His Holiness on 3 September 1935 and counselor of the nunciature to France in 1944.

On 23 April 1946, Pacini was appointed Nuncio to Haiti and Santo Domingo and Titular Archbishop of Germia by Pope Pius XII. He received his episcopal consecration on the following 11 June from Archbishop Angelo Roncalli, with Archbishop Louis Le Hunsec, CSSP, and Bishop Stanislas Courbe serving as co-consecrators, in Paris.

Pacini was named Nuncio to Uruguay on 23 April 1949, and Nuncio to Switzerland on 4 February 1960. From 1962 to 1965, he attended the Second Vatican Council.

Pope Paul VI made him Cardinal-Priest of Santi Angeli Custodi a Città Giardino in the consistory of 26 June 1967. Pacini died in Rome at age 79 and was buried in his family's tomb in Capannori.

References

External links 
Cardinals of the Holy Roman Church
Catholic-Hierarchy

1888 births
1967 deaths
Apostolic Nuncios to Haiti
Apostolic Nuncios to the Dominican Republic
Apostolic Nuncios to Switzerland
Apostolic Nuncios to Uruguay
20th-century Italian cardinals
Participants in the Second Vatican Council
Cardinals created by Pope Paul VI
Italian military chaplains
World War I chaplains